A Hero of the Big Snows is a 1926 American silent adventure film directed by Herman C. Raymaker and written by Ewart Adamson. The film stars Rin Tin Tin, Alice Calhoun, Don Alvarado, Leo Willis and Mary Jane Milliken. The film was released by Warner Bros. on July 24, 1926.

Cast
 Rin Tin Tin as Rinty
 Alice Calhoun as Mary Mallory
 Don Alvarado as Ed Nolan
 Leo Willis as Black Beasley
 Mary Jane Milliken as Mary Mallory's Little Sister

Preservation status
As July 2016, according to the Library of Congress, the film survives at Archives Françaises du film du CNC.

References

External links
 
 

1926 films
Warner Bros. films
American silent feature films
American adventure films
1926 adventure films
American black-and-white films
Rin Tin Tin
Films directed by Herman C. Raymaker
1920s English-language films
1920s American films
Silent adventure films